Stephen Adams (born 1937) is an American businessman, private equity investor, and philanthropist. His current holdings include Good Sam Enterprises, a national publishing, retail stores, and member-based direct marketing organization directed toward owners of recreational vehicles and Adams Outdoor Advertising, an operator of outdoor advertising structures in the Midwest, Southeast, and Mid-Atlantic regions of the United States. His previous holdings have included operators of television and radio stations, print publishers, cola bottlers and community banks.

Early life

Adams was born in 1937 and was raised in Minnesota. Adams received a bachelor's degree in 1959 from Yale University, where he was a member of Skull and Bones. He received his MBA from the Stanford Graduate School of Business in 1962. Adams is the son of long-time newspaper journalist and CBS radio and television broadcaster Cedric Adams.

Professional career
As of the end of 2007, Adams served as chairman of the board of Affinity Group Inc., FreedomRoads and Affinity Bank (now known as Camping World/Goodsam, Inc.) and is also chairman and the controlling shareholder of Adams Outdoor Advertising.  He has been chairman of Affinity Group Inc. since its acquisition in December 1988 and chairman of Adams Outdoor Advertising since its founding in 1983. He also serves as chairman of Adams Radio Group (based in Lakeville, Minnesota) and Adams Publishing Group (based in St. Louis Park, Minnesota).

Adams began his career in banking and soft drink bottling.  Since the 1970s, Adams has served as chairman of privately owned banking, bottling, publishing, outdoor advertising, television and radio companies in which he holds a controlling ownership interest. Adams currently owns Chateau Fonplagade in Bordeaux as well as other left bank wineries, and Adamus, Michel-Schlumberger, Roblar, and Adler Fels wineries in Northern California.

In 1982, he won a protracted fight to gain control of the Bank of Montana System. In 1984, Adams failed in a bid to take control of publicly-traded Union Planters. Bank of Montana System was sold to Norwest Corporation in 1993.

Adams Outdoor
Adams Outdoor was founded in 1983 with the acquisition of Central Outdoor Advertising, located in Michigan. Over the next five years, Adams pursued a rollup of billboard and other outdoor advertising assets into additional medium-sized markets, primarily through the acquisition of existing outdoor advertising businesses in selected midwest, southeast and mid-Atlantic states (examples being Central Outdoor in Michigan, Creative Displays in the Lehigh Valley, and Schloss Outdoor in North Carolina).  Today the company is privately held, however in its final year of reporting public financials, 2000, the company had approximately $80 million of revenue.  Since 2000, the company has increased its market position from the 6th largest outdoor advertising company in the US to the 4th largest behind Clear Channel Outdoor, Lamar Advertising Company, and Outfront Media. In January 2015, Adams Outdoor partnered with Chicago-based private equity firm GTCR, to purchase Fairway Outdoor, effectively doubling the Outdoor holdings of Adams.

Affinity Group Inc.
On December 23, 1988, the direct predecessor of Affinity Group Inc. (AGI), owned by Adams, acquired a company called American Bakeries Company for about $138 million.  At the time of the merger, the sole operating assets of American Bakeries Company were TL Enterprises, Inc. (Trailer Life magazine) and Camp Coast to Coast, Inc. These entities consisted of what is today the Good Sam Club, Coast to Coast, AGI’s subscription-based products and services business and AGI’s RV-related publications, with the exception of the Woodall’s titles.

From 1990 through 1997 AGI acquired other companies. Among the purchases were Golf Card International in 1990 for about $18 million; and in May 1994, Woodall Publishing Company, L.P.  and Woodall World of Travel, L.P. (collectively Woodall’s) for about $11.5 million.

In 1995, AGI acquired the 13-year-old San Francisco Thrift and Loan and moved the company’s headquarters to Ventura, California. In 1997, the bank was renamed Affinity Bank; in 1999, AGI transferred ownership to Affinity Bank Holdings, Inc. a separate entity controlled by Adams

In March 1997, as part of AGI’s $130.0-million offering of the holding company notes due 2007, AGI acquired Camping World, Inc. and Ehlert Publishing for about $123.0 million and $22.3 million, respectively. AGI is now known as Camping World/GoodSam, and is the largest RV dealer network and camping retailer in the United States. NBC's "The Profit" features Camping World/Goodsam CEO Marcus Lemonis as its star. On October 7, 2016, Camping World/GoodSam completed its initial public offering as Camping World Holdings, Inc.; today, it trades on the New York Stock Exchange as CWH.

Newspapers
In 2013, Stephen Adams' son, Mark Adams, formed Adams Publishing Group (APG).  Stephen Adams serves as Chairman of the board of Adams Publishing Group.   APG is a Limited liability company that owns newspapers in over 20 states.  It is currently headquartered in Greeneville, Tennessee.

Political affiliations
Adams has raised funds for Republican Party candidates.  He reportedly contributed over $1 million of billboard advertising (through his Adams Outdoor Advertising business) to support George W. Bush's 2000 presidential campaign.

Philanthropy
As of 2017, Adams serves on the board of visitors for the Yale School of Music.  The Adams Family Foundation, founded by Adams and his wife, Denise, has made grants to a variety of educational institutions including Yale University, Stanford University, Westmont College, the Lyme Academy College of Fine Arts and The Blake School.  Adams gave a $100 million gift to the Yale School of Music, the largest single contribution in the school's 108-year history to that point. Adams funded the construction of the Adams Center for Musical Arts at Yale University and was dedicated in a ceremony officiated by Yale President Peter Salovey, on February 16, 2017.

Awards
Adams was selected to receive the Arbuckle Award from Stanford University's Graduate School of Business in 2006. In 2009, Adams received the Yale Medal, the highest award bestowed by the Yale Alumni Association.

Personal life
Adams is married to his fourth wife, the former Denise Rhea. He has four sons from his first marriage to the late Virginia Susan Ridgway: Stephen Marcus, Mark Charles, Kent Ridgway, and Scott Learned Adams. Ridgway was the granddaughter of John Ridgway, co-founder of IDS (now known as Ameriprise Financial). Ameriprise Financial is a Fortune 200 company with a market capitalization of $21 billion. The Ridgway family sold their interest in IDS to American Express in 1984 for $600 million. IDS/American Express subsequently was renamed American Express Financial Advisers, and subsequently was spun off by American Express as its own publicly-traded company in 2005, and renamed Ameriprise Financial. The company's flagship corporate headquarters, the IDS Centre, is the tallest building in Minneapolis, Minnesota, designed by Phillip Johnson and completed in 1974, though it no longer houses Ameriprise's corporate headquarters. Adams lives in Roxbury, Connecticut; Healdsburg, California; Big Timber, Montana; and Saint Emilion (Bordeaux), France.

See also
Affinity Group Inc.
Camping World

References

External links
Affinity Group (official website)
Affinity Bank (official website)
Adams Outdoor Adveritising (official website)
Camping World (official website)
Affinity Group Holding Inc Company History (FundingUniverse.com)

1937 births
Living people
American bankers
American advertising executives
American publishing chief executives
American investors
American media executives
American philanthropists
American political fundraisers
Businesspeople from Minnesota
Minnesota Republicans
Private equity and venture capital investors
Stanford Graduate School of Business alumni
Yale University alumni
American retail chief executives
American newspaper chain founders